Skopia is a village of the Elassona municipality. Before the 2011 local government reform it was a part of the municipality of Olympos. The 2011 census recorded 95 inhabitants in the village. Skopia is a part of the community of Flampouro.

Population
According to the 2011 census, the population of the settlement of Skopia was 95 people, an increase of almost 3% compared with the population of the previous census of 2001.

See also
 List of settlements in the Larissa regional unit

References

Populated places in Larissa (regional unit)